The 2016–17 Úrvalsdeild karla was the 66th season of the Úrvalsdeild karla, the top tier men's basketball league in Iceland. The season started on 6 October 2016 and ended on 30 April 2017. KR won its fourth title in a row by defeating Grindavík 3–2 in the Finals.

Competition format
The participating teams first played a conventional round-robin schedule with every team playing each opponent once "home" and once "away" for a total of 22 games. The top eight teams qualified for the championship playoffs whilst the two last qualified were relegated to Division 1.

Regular season

Playoffs

References

External links
Official Icelandic Basketball Federation website

Icelandic
Lea
Úrvalsdeild karla (basketball)